Curling at the 2011 Canada Winter Games took place at the Mayflower Curling Club in Halifax, Nova Scotia.

The women's competition was held from February 13–18, ending with a win by British Columbia's Corryn Cecile Brown in a 3-1 victory over Alberta's Jocelyn Peterman. Ontario's Laura Horton won the bronze medal after defeating host Nova Scotia's Emily Dwyer. The men's competition, held from February 21–26, ended with a close 6-5 win by Ontario's Ben Bevan over Saskatchewan's Brady Scharback, while Manitoba's Kyle Doering secured a win over New Brunswick's Scott Babin.

Medallists

Women

Teams

Standings

Round robin

Draw 1
Sunday, February 13, 10:00

Draw 2
Sunday, February 13, 14:30

Draw 3
Monday, February 14, 10:00

Draw 4
Monday, February 14, 14:30

Draw 5
Tuesday, February 15, 10:00

Draw 6
Tuesday, February 15, 14:30

Draw 7
Wednesday, February 16, 10:00

Draw 8
Wednesday, February 16, 14:30

Draw 9
Wednesday, February 16, 19:30

Crossover
Thursday, February 17, 19:30

Playoffs

Semifinals
Friday, February 18, 10:00

Bronze Medal Game
Friday, February 18, 14:30

Gold Medal Game
Friday, February 18, 19:30

Final standings

Men

Teams

Standings

Round robin

Draw 1
Monday, February 21, 10:00

Draw 2
Monday, February 21, 14:30

Draw 3
Tuesday, February 22, 10:00

Draw 4
Tuesday, February 22, 14:30

Draw 5
Wednesday, February 23, 10:00

Draw 6
Wednesday, February 23, 14:30

Draw 7
Thursday, February 24, 10:00

Draw 8
Thursday, February 24, 14:30

Draw 9
Thursday, February 24, 19:30

Crossover
Friday, February 25, 19:30

Playoffs

Semifinals
Saturday, February 26, 10:00

Bronze Medal Game
Saturday, February 26, 14:30

Gold Medal Game
Saturday, February 26, 19:30

Final standings

References

External links
2011 Canada Games Curling Home
Curling Results
Mayflower Curling Club

2011 Canada Winter Games
Winter
2011 Canada Winter Games